Mohammed Sani Shuaibu (born November 17, 1984 in Minna) is a Nigerian football player currently with Shooting Stars F.C.

Early life
Hails from Minna in Minna local government area of Niger State, he is otherwise called ‘Efosa', his ambition is to become a successful professional player.

Career
He started his professional career with the Niger Tornadoes F.C. of Minna (1999–2004) and joined Kwara United F.C. of Ilorin for the 2005 season. He was in the National Challenge FA Cup winning team in 2000 which qualified the team to play in the African Winners (Mandela) Cup in 2001. he was a member of the Niger Tornadoes F.C. team that played the West African Football Union (WAFU) in 2000. In September 2009 the former member of Niger Tornadoes F.C. and Kwara United F.C. signed for Shooting Stars F.C.

References

External links
 Official Facebook

1984 births
Living people
Nigerian footballers
Association football midfielders
Kwara United F.C. players
Niger Tornadoes F.C. players
People from Niger State